Specklinia stillsonii is a species of orchid plant native to Haiti.

References 

stillsonii
Flora of Haiti
Flora without expected TNC conservation status